Phonicosia is a genus of bryozoans belonging to the family Lacernidae.

The species of this genus are found in Australia, New Zealand, Malesia, southernmost South America.

Species:

Phonicosia circinata 
Phonicosia crena 
Phonicosia jousseaumi 
Phonicosia oviseparata 
Phonicosia reingensis 
Phonicosia sinuosa 
Phonicosia vandiemenensis

References

Bryozoan genera